"Make It Last" is a song by Australian singer songwriter Kate Miller-Heidke and released in September 2007 as the second single from Miller-Heidke's debut studio album Little Eve.

Music video
The music video was directed by Stephen Lance and Mairi Cameron of HEAD PICTURES. It features Heidke in a backyard sale, selling 'things of the past'. During the chorus, we see her and other dancing with lamps.

Track listing
Digital EP
 Make It Last (Radio Mix)
 I Got the way (Live At The National Theatre)

References

2007 singles
2007 songs
Kate Miller-Heidke songs
Songs written by Kate Miller-Heidke
Song recordings produced by Magoo (Australian producer)
Sony BMG singles